Alterra may refer to:
 Alterra Power, a Canadian energy company
 Alterra Coffee Roasters, an American café chain
 Alterra Mountain Company, a North American ski resort operator
 Alterra Corporation, a fictional corporation in the game Subnautica